The 1971–72 season was Port Vale's 60th season of football in the Football League, and their second successive season (eighth overall) back in the Third Division. Roy Sproson's 22-year career at the club came to an end, in what was an otherwise unremarkable campaign.

Overview

Third Division
The pre-season saw the arrival of left-half John Flowers from Doncaster Rovers and full-back Tony Loska from Shrewsbury Town for 'a small fee'. Meanwhile, three players picked up injuries: John James (cartilage), Roy Sproson (ribs), and Stuart Sharratt (ankle); whilst Sammy Morgan threatened to quit altogether after falling out with manager Gordon Lee over his decision to remain resident in Great Yarmouth rather than moving nearer to Burslem. Violence broke out in pre-season games, as the sport was in the grip of hooliganism.

The season opened with a 1–1 draw with Brighton & Hove Albion in front of just 4,384 fans, causing Lee to warn that such low attendances would require him to sell off the club's best players. By the end of September Vale were performing well on the pitch, and off it had sold the main car park to The Co-operative Group for £30,000. Goals were at a premium despite a 4–3 win over York City and 4–4 draw with Aston Villa at Vale Park. Sporadic violence continued to break out at many matches, as local businesses had their windows smashed, local residents were menaced and fights broke out. In November, Clint Boulton was sold to Torquay United for £10,000. The next month Lee brought Ray Harford from Mansfield Town for a £5,000 fee, as well as Keith Lindsey from Southend United for 'a small fee'. Vale comfortable in the league, Chairman Graham Bourne resigned in January, along with colleague and fellow director George Sanders. This left the Board of Directors with just two members, one of which, previous chairman Mark Singer, was re-elected as Chairman. The Sentinel'''s Chris Harper stated that "Vale will never make progress while they are plagued by trouble at the top". The team continued with good home form, but invariably lost away from Vale Park. On 16 February, Sammy Morgan scored on his debut for Northern Ireland, and picked up six further caps whilst at the club. On 4 March, only 2,809 bothered to turn out for a 1–0 home win over Mansfield Town in strong wind and snow, whilst rivals Stoke City won the 1972 League Cup Final in front of a crowd of nearly 100,000 at Wembley Stadium. Vale went on to go ten games without a win, also scoring just one goal in a run of seven games, to the frustration of their supporters. Despite this, the now annual 'Meet the Manager' evening 'warmed the heart' of Lee. A 1–0 win over Barnsley at the end of April ensured the club's safety from the drop. On 8 May, Sproson made his farewell competitive appearance for the club in front of only 2,743 supporters, in a 2–1 defeat to Rotherham United. Lee angrily declared that "the attendance was nothing short of a disgrace to mark the end of a legend". Four days later there was an even smaller turnout for a final day 1–1 draw with Rochdale.

They finished in fifteenth place with 41 points, 30 of which were won at home. With just 43 goals scored, they had the lowest goal tally outside of the bottom four.

Finances
On the financial side, a drop in average home attendance of over a thousand failed to prevent a profit of £596. This profit was due to a £10,000 transfer credit and £13,967 worth of donations from the Sportsmen's Association and the Development Fund. The club's total debt stood at £100,130. Four players were let go at the end of the campaign: Mick Morris (Stafford Rangers), Keith Ball (Stourport), Stuart Sharratt (retired), and John Flowers (Eastwood). Sproson also retired as a player, but stayed on as a scout and coach.

Cup competitions
In the FA Cup, Vale beat Blackburn Rovers 3–1 following a 1–1 draw at Ewood Park. A last-minute Sammy Morgan goal then defeated Fourth Division Darlington in the Second Round. Vale then were defeated 3–0 at St Andrew's by Second Division Birmingham City.

In the League Cup, Vale made 'their annual early exist', losing 2–0 at home to Shrewsbury Town.

League table

ResultsPort Vale's score comes first''

Football League Third Division

Results by matchday

Matches

FA Cup

League Cup

Player statistics

Appearances

Top scorers

Transfers

Transfers in

Transfers out

References
Specific

General

Port Vale F.C. seasons
Port Vale